Mikaela Mässing (born 13 March 1994) is a Swedish handballer, who plays for Alingsås HK and the Swedish national team. 

In 2022 she announced she was taking a break from handball due to a long term knee injury, and then made a comeback in 2023 in the lower division Swedish club Alingsås HK.

International achievements  
Challenge Cup:
Finalist: 2017

Individual awards
 MVP of the Swedish League: 2019

References

External links

1994 births
Living people
People from Mölndal
Swedish female handball players
Expatriate handball players
Swedish expatriate sportspeople in Germany
Swedish expatriate sportspeople in Romania
CS Minaur Baia Mare (women's handball) players
Sportspeople from Västra Götaland County
21st-century Swedish women